Wilma Dressel (born 29 August 1983 in Dortmund) is a German rower.

References 
 

1983 births
Living people
German female rowers
Sportspeople from Dortmund
World Rowing Championships medalists for Germany
21st-century German women